SS Yoma was a British passenger liner that served as a troop ship in the Second World War. She was built in Scotland in 1928, and from then until 1940 Yoma ran a regular route between Glasgow in Scotland and Rangoon in Burma via Liverpool, Palma, Marseille and Egypt. She became a troop ship in 1941 and was sunk with great loss of life in the Mediterranean in 1943.

Yoma was a ship of the Henderson Line of Glasgow. She was managed by P Henderson & Company and initially owned jointly by two other P Henderson companies: British and Burmese Steam Navigation Company Ltd and Burmah Steam Ship Company Ltd. From 1934 the British and Burmese SN Co Ltd was Yomas sole owner.

Yoma was one of a family of similarly sized liners built for Henderson's by William Denny and Brothers of Dumbarton on the River Clyde.

Namesakes
Yoma was the second of four similarly named vessels in Henderson's fleet.

Engines
Yomas boilers had oil-burning furnaces and supplied steam to a quadruple expansion steam engine rated at 550 NHP. In 1939 a low-pressure steam turbine was added to supplement the reciprocating engine. The turbine ran on exhaust steam from the reciprocating engine's low-pressure cylinder and drove the propeller shaft by double-reduction gearing and an hydraulic coupling.

Civilian service at war
For 15 months after the UK's entry into the Second World War Yoma continued her service between Britain and Burma, but sailing in convoys for the most hazardous parts of her route. On 19 September 1939 she left Liverpool for Rangoon with general cargo and 125 passengers. She sailed with Convoy OB 7 until it dispersed in the North Atlantic, then from Gibraltar as far as Alexandria she sailed with Convoy Green 3. She returned from Rangoon to Britain carrying general cargo, sailing with Convoy HG 10 from Gibraltar to Liverpool for the last leg of her voyage.

In January 1940 Yoma left Liverpool for Rangoon, sailing with Convoy OB 73 which at sea became the fast convoy Convoy OG 15F to Gibraltar. On her return from Rangoon she joined Convoy HG 24 at Gibraltar at the end of March, which reached Liverpool in the first week of April.

Before the end of April she left Liverpool for Rangoon, sailing with Convoy OB-133 which at sea became the fast convoy [Convoy OG 27F to Gibraltar. However, before Yomas return from Rangoon Italy entered the war, making the Mediterranean unsafe for Allied merchant shipping. She therefore made a longer return voyage via the Cape of Good Hope, the South Atlantic and West Africa. At Freetown in Sierra Leone she joined the fast Convoy SL-39F, which caught up with and joined Convoy SL 39 at sea. SL-39 reached Liverpool at the end of July.

At the end of August 1940 Yoma left Liverpool for Rangoon, sailing with Convoy OB 204 until it dispersed at sea. Using the loger route via the Cape of Good Hope it was not until December that she returned, joining Convoy SL 58 for the homeward leg of the voyage from Freetown to Liverpool.

Indian Ocean troop ship
In January 1941 Yoma was converted into a troop ship. On 18 February carrying 1,628 troops she sailed from the Firth of Clyde with Convoy WS 6B to Freetown, and on 8 April 1941 she left Freetown with Convoy WS 6 to Cape Town. After rounding the Cape of Good Hope she spent the next two years in the Indian Ocean, moving troops mostly between Mombasa, Aden, Bombay, Colombo and Bandar Abbas. In January 1942 Japan invaded the Dutch East Indies and in February Yoma took troops from Colombo to Batavia, arriving with Convoy JS 1 and returning with Convoy SJ 5. Embarking troops at Durban 11–12 February 1943. Sailed Durban 13 February 1943 in a convoy escorted by HMS Dauntless and two destroyers; after the 22nd the escort was an armed merchantman; arriving Bombay 4 March 1943.  Yomas final Indian Ocean voyage was with Convoy PA-33 from Bandar Abbas to Aden in April 1943.

Convoy GTX 2 and loss

On 13 May Axis forces in Tunisia surrendered, ending the North African Campaign and opening the way for the Allied Invasion of Sicily. Yoma was transferred to the Mediterranean, and on 17 May she sailed with Convoy KMX 14X from Gibraltar to Alexandria.

On 8 June she again left Gibraltar for Alexandria, this time in Convoy GTX 2. She called at Sfax in Tunisia and Tripoli in Libya, leaving the latter on 16 June. She left Tripoli carrying 134 officers and 994 other ranks of the British Army and 22 officers and 643 ratings of the Free French Naval Forces. Many of the British troops were Royal Engineers, including 994 Dock Operating Company and 1010 Dock Operating Company, who were going to Alexandria to be kitted out and were then to operate port facilities for the Sicilian campaign.

On the morning of 17 June the convoy was northwest of the port of Derna, Libya. At 0733 hours many of the men were below decks having breakfast when  commanded by Oberleutnant zur See Johann-Otto Krieg fired two torpedoes. Accounts differ as to what followed. U-boat historian Guðmundur Helgason states that one torpedo hit Yoma, but Second World War blogger Martin Cherrett states that both of them hit her, one in her engine room and the other in her number 4 hold, sinking her within five minutes. Either way, the Chief Officer, A Olding, reported that she sank rapidly. Olding stated that the explosion destroyed the after engine room bulkhead, rapidly flooding the engine room, boiler room and no. 5 hold and blowing the hatches of nos. 3 and 4 holds. As men scrambled for safety, the ladders on No. 2 mess deck collapsed, trapping many men below decks.

Yoma settled rapidly by her stern and was shrouded by escaping steam and clouds of coal dust. Her Master, George Patterson ordered "abandon ship" and Chief Officer Olding was among those who made for their boat stations. Olding and his lifeboat crew succeeded in releasing their boat so that it floated as the ship went down. The ship sank stern first, and as she did her bow rose more steeply. Olding described:

"...by this time the Yoma was well down by the stern and the next thing I knew she sank under my feet and I found myself in the water... as the boat rose I saw a lot of men on the foc’sle head: they would not jump into the water,... as the bow lifted a number of them lost their footing and fell onto the bridge, many others being dragged under by the ship."

Two of the Royal Engineers having breakfast were Herbert Cullum from County Durham and his friend George Monk. Monk told the Cullum family:
"Bert was at hand's reach from me, when it happened. We all got thrown across seats and on the floor and after I managed to regain my feet, which was very difficult, I looked around for Bert. He was nowhere to be seen... after great difficulty and luck I found myself in the water, and for the one and three quarter hours in which I was drifting around my eyes were constantly looking for Bert, but could not see him."

484 people were killed: Captain Patterson, 29 crew members, three DEMS gunners and 451 military personnel. Because of the danger from enemy submarines Convoy GTX 2 continued on its way. Between them the five vessels rescued 130 crew members, five DEMS gunners and 1,342 military personnel.

Monuments
Most of the 484 people killed in Yomas sinking have no known grave. The Brookwood Memorial in Surrey lists those who were UK or Commonwealth military personnel. The Second World War part of the Tower Hill Memorial in the City of London lists those who were members of Yomas Merchant Navy crew.

Successor ships
In 1952 Elder Dempster Lines took over Henderson's and transferred TSS Yoma to the Elder Dempster fleet. In 1965 TSS Yoma was sold to Taiwanese owners and renamed Hai Ping. In the same year Elder, Dempster transferred a 1958-built motor ship, the  MS Daru, to the Henderson fleet and renamed Yoma. Also in 1965, Elder, Dempster took over John Holt & Co and its subsidiary Gulf Guinea Line. In 1966 Elder, Dempster changed MS Yoma back to Daru and transferred her to Guinea Gulf Line. In 1979 she was sold to Liberian owners and renamed Lone Eagle.

References

Sources

Further reading

 

1928 ships
Royal Engineers
Maritime incidents in June 1943
Passenger ships of the United Kingdom
Ships sunk by German submarines in World War II
Shipwrecks of Libya
Steamships of the United Kingdom
Troop ships of the United Kingdom
World War II shipwrecks in the Mediterranean Sea